Under the Galician Statute of Autonomy, the president of the Regional Government of Galicia is the head of the government of the Spanish autonomous community of Galicia. Namely, he or she is the president of the executive body of the Galician government, the Xunta de Galicia.

As in other parliamentary democracies the president is actually appointed by the Parliament which is, on the other hand, directly voted in by the citizens.

The democratic period in Galicia starts in 1977 with the end of Francoist Spain. Before that Galicia had last enjoyed self-government in the Middle Ages, in addition to a short period when the Xunta Suprema de Galicia was established during the Peninsular War (1808-1813).

Technically speaking, the first two presidents up to 1981 were presidents of a non-autonomous Galicia, since the actual Statute of Autonomy was only passed in April 1981. Nonetheless, they played an important role in setting up the institution.

List of presidents
Governments:

Timeline

See also
Xunta de Galicia
Parliament of Galicia
Autonomous Community
Devolution
History of Galicia
Galician Statute of Autonomy

Notes